The 2019 OEC Taipei WTA Challenger was a professional tennis tournament played on indoor carpet courts. It was the 12th edition of the tournament and part of the 2019 WTA 125K series, offering a total of $125,000 in prize money. It took place at the Taipei Arena in Taipei, Taiwan, on 11–17 November 2019.

Singles main draw entrants

Seeds 

 1 Rankings as of 4 November 2019.

Other entrants 
The following player received wildcards into the singles main draw:
  Eudice Chong
  Joanna Garland
  Hsu Ching-wen
  Yang Ya-yi 

The following players received entry from the qualifying draw:
  Lee Ya-hsin 
  Storm Sanders 
  Aldila Sutjiadi
  Emily Webley-Smith

Withdrawals
  Lizette Cabrera → replaced by  Susan Bandecchi
  Jaqueline Cristian → replaced by  Arina Rodionova
  Maddison Inglis → replaced by  Urszula Radwańska
  Luksika Kumkhum → replaced by  Naiktha Bains
  Liang En-shuo → replaced by  Kamilla Rakhimova
  Monica Niculescu → replaced by  Jana Fett
  Elena-Gabriela Ruse → replaced by  Amandine Hesse
  Valeria Savinykh → replaced by  Lee Ya-hsuan
  Nina Stojanović → replaced by  Kyōka Okamura
  Martina Trevisan → replaced by  Peangtarn Plipuech

Doubles entrants

Seeds 

 1 Rankings as of 4 November 2019.

Other entrants 
The following pair received a wildcard into the doubles main draw:
  Joanna Garland /  Yang Ya-yi

Champions

Singles

  Vitalia Diatchenko def.  Tímea Babos, 6–3, 6–2

Doubles

  Lee Ya-hsuan /  Wu Fang-hsien def.  Dalila Jakupović /  Danka Kovinić 4–6, 6–4, [10–7]

References

External links 
 Official website 

2019 WTA 125K series
Tennis tournaments in Taiwan
November 2019 sports events in Asia
2019 in Taiwanese tennis
2019 in Taiwanese women's sport